Unique Thompson (born July 27, 1999) is an American professional basketball player who is a free agent in the Women's National Basketball Association (WNBA). She was chosen in the second round of the 2021 WNBA Draft by the Indiana Fever of the Women's National Basketball Association.

Thompson grew up in Theodore, Alabama, where she attended Faith Academy. She was the #74 overall recruit in her draft class and the #16 forward.

Thompson played college basketball at Auburn University. She averaged 14.1 points, 10.6 rebounds, 1.3 assists, 1.7 steals, and 0.6 blocks per game in college on a 52.8% field goal percentage. Thompson was an All-American honorable mention in 2020 and 2021. She was named to the All-SEC First Team in 2020 and the Second Team in 2021. She totaled 1,540 career points; 1,156 rebounds, making her Auburn's all-time leading rebounds; and 58 double-doubles, which is also a team record.

Thompson declared for the WNBA Draft in spring 2021. She is the ninth player in Auburn program history to be drafted and the first since 2009.

Auburn statistics
Source

Awards and honors 

 2018 SEC All Freshman team
2020 All-SEC First team

References

Living people
1999 births
American women's basketball players
Auburn Tigers women's basketball players
Indiana Fever draft picks
Basketball players from Alabama
People from Mobile County, Alabama